Arisaka (written: 有坂) is a Japanese surname. Notable people with the surname include:

, Japanese linguist
, Japanese-American singer
, Japanese general

Japanese-language surnames